She (died 613 BC) was for two months in 613 BC ruler of the State of Qi during the Spring and Autumn period of ancient China.  His personal name was Lü She (呂舍), ancestral name Jiang (姜), and he was not given a posthumous title due to his short reign.

Prince She was the son of Duke Zhao of Qi, who died in the fifth month of 613 BC after 20 years of reign.  Prince She succeeded his father as ruler of Qi, but was murdered just two months later by his uncle, Duke Zhao's younger brother Shangren, who usurped the throne and became known as Duke Yì of Qi.

Ancestry

References

Monarchs of Qi (state)
7th-century BC Chinese monarchs
613 BC deaths
Year of birth unknown